The Ruhr University Bochum is a public research university located in the southern hills of the central Ruhr area, Bochum, Germany. It was founded in 1962 as the first new public university in Germany after World War II. Instruction began in 1965.

The Ruhr-University Bochum is one of the largest universities in Germany and part of the Deutsche Forschungsgemeinschaft, the most important German research funding organization.

The RUB was very successful in the Excellence Initiative of the German Federal and State Governments (2007), a competition between Germany's most prestigious universities. It was one of the few institutions left competing for the title of an "elite university", but did not succeed in the last round of the competition. There are currently nine universities in Germany that hold this title.

The University of Bochum was one of the first universities in Germany to introduce international bachelor's and master's degrees, which replaced the traditional German Diplom and Magister. Except for a few special cases, such as law, these degrees are offered by all faculties of the Ruhr-University. Currently, the university offers a total of 184 different study programs from all academic fields represented at the university.

Facilities
Unlike many older German universities, the buildings of Ruhr-University are all centralized on one campus, located south of Bochum city. The Faculty of Medicine includes several university clinics that are located at different centres in Bochum and the Ruhr area. A major facility for patient care is the University Hospital/Knappschaftskrankenhaus in the district Langendreer of Bochum. Internationally renowned experts in their respective fields include professors Wolff Schmiegel in oncology and Burkhard Dick in ophthalmology. The centralized university campus architecture is comprised almost exclusively of the 1960s architecture style referred to as Brutalism, consisting of 14 almost identical high-rise buildings. One striking feature of these buildings is that although their roofs are all at the same apparent height (sky level), the absolute heights of the buildings vary in accordance with their placement on the undulating landscape in which the university is located: the campus is at the edge of a green belt on high ground adjacent to the Ruhr valley.

The arrangement of the buildings and the (concrete) paths and bridges between them was originally meant to resemble a "harbour of knowledge", with the buildings symbolising vessels, by architect Helmut Hentrich.

The campus has undergone heavy modernisation and extension efforts, including the construction and refurbishment of several buildings. 
Some of the original 1960s buildings are to be rebuilt, instead of refurbished, due to PCB contamination. 
The overall campus concept envisions a modern facility and the placement of Bochum as a "knowledge city".

Organization

Ruhr-University is financed and administered by the state of North Rhine-Westphalia. Currently, 42,718 students are enrolled, and the university employs around 5,600 staff (411 of which are professors), making it one of the ten largest universities in Germany as of 2014. Kurt Biedenkopf, who later became prime minister of the state of Saxony, was rector of the university from 1967 to 1969.

The university is organized into twenty-one different faculties. These are:

 Faculty of Protestant Theology
 Faculty of Catholic Theology
 Faculty of Philosophy, Education and Journalism
 Faculty of History (including the departments of History, Art History and Archaeological Sciences)
 Faculty of Philology
 Faculty of Law
 Faculty of Economics
 Faculty of Social Science
 Faculty of East Asian Studies
 Faculty of Sports Science
 Faculty of Psychology
 Faculty of Civil and Environmental Engineering
 Faculty of Mechanical Engineering
 Faculty of Electrical Engineering and Information Technology
 Faculty of Mathematics
 Faculty of Physics and Astronomy
 Faculty of Geosciences
 Faculty of Chemistry and Biochemistry
 Faculty of Biology and Biotechnology
 Faculty of Medicine
 Faculty of Computer Science

ECUE - European Culture and Economy

Interdisciplinary institutions
 Interdisciplinary Centre for Advanced Materials Simulation (ICAMS)
 International Graduate School of Neuroscience
 Institute for International Law of Peace and Armed Conflict (IFHV)

Points of interest
 Botanischer Garten der Ruhr-Universität Bochum, a botanical garden with Chinese garden
 Hegel-Archiv, the archives of the German philosopher Georg Wilhelm Friedrich Hegel
 Medical historical collection of the Ruhr-University 
Art collection, including Antiquity Museum of the Ruhr-University
Audimax and Klais-Organ of the Ruhr-University
Musisches Zentrum (Artistic center)

Notable alumni

 Afu Thomas (Thomas Derksen), internet celebrity
 Anke Kaysser-Pyzalla, CEO of German Aerospace Center, former president of the Technical University of Braunschweig
 Hans-Paul Bürkner, Chairman of Boston Consulting Group, former global CEO
 Stefan Sommer, former CEO of ZF Friedrichshafen
 Florian Steger, medical historian and ethicist
 Norbert Lammert, politician, 12th President of the Bundestag from 2005 to 2017
 Reinhard Marx, cardinal in the Catholic church
 Sadeq Tabatabaei, writer, journalist, TV host, university professor at the University of Tehran and politician
 Svenja Schulze, politician, Minister for Economic Cooperation and Development
 Katrin Suder, politician and management consultant

See also
 List of colleges and universities
 ConRuhr

References

External links

  

 
Bochum
Educational institutions established in 1962
Bochum
1962 establishments in West Germany